Martha Mugler (née Vogel; born July 23, 1961) is an American politician from Virginia. She was first elected to the Hampton School Board in 2008 then to the Virginia House of Delegates in 2019. She won the seat vacated by retiring Republican Delegate Gordon Helsel. She represented a district covering a large slice of Hampton, as well as all of the neighboring city of Poquoson. In 2021, she was initially declared the loser to Republican Aijalon "A.C." Cordoza, an information technology specialist. However, due to the closeness of the win, a recount was held. After the recount, Mugler conceded. She was elected to an at large seat on Hampton City Council on November 8, 2022.

Electoral history

References

External links 
 Campaign website

Living people
Democratic Party members of the Virginia House of Delegates
School board members in Virginia
Radford University alumni
Women state legislators in Virginia
Politicians from Hampton, Virginia
21st-century American politicians
21st-century American women politicians
1961 births